Massachusetts House of Representatives' 14th Essex district in the United States is one of 160 legislative districts included in the lower house of the Massachusetts General Court. It covers part of Essex County. Democrat Christina Minicucci of North Andover has represented the district since 2019.

Locales represented
The district includes the following localities:
 part of Haverhill
 part of Lawrence
 part of Methuen
 part of North Andover

The current district geographic boundary overlaps with those of the Massachusetts Senate's 1st Essex, 1st Essex and Middlesex, and 2nd Essex and Middlesex districts.

Former locale
The district previously covered part of Salem, circa 1872.

Representatives
 Eleazer Austin, circa 1858 
 Thomas D. Hamson, circa 1858-1859 
 Benjamin G. Hathaway, circa 1859 
 Samuel L. Gracey, circa 1888 
 Charles H. Annis, circa 1920 
 William F. Craig, circa 1920 
 George Henry Newhall, circa 1920 
 John A. Davis, circa 1951 
 Eben Parsons, circa 1951 
 Kendall Ainsworth Sanderson, circa 1951 
 Bernard D. Flynn, circa 1975 
 Joseph N. Hermann, 1979-1993
 Donna Cuomo, 1993-1999
 David Torrisi, 1999-2013
 Diana DiZoglio, 2013-2019
 Christina Minicucci, 2019-current

See also
 List of Massachusetts House of Representatives elections
 Other Essex County districts of the Massachusetts House of Representatives: 1st, 2nd, 3rd, 4th, 5th, 6th, 7th, 8th, 9th, 10th, 11th, 12th, 13th, 15th, 16th, 17th, 18th
 Essex County districts of the Massachusett Senate: 1st, 2nd, 3rd; 1st Essex and Middlesex; 2nd Essex and Middlesex
 List of Massachusetts General Courts
 List of former districts of the Massachusetts House of Representatives

Images

References

External links
 Ballotpedia
  (State House district information based on U.S. Census Bureau's American Community Survey).
 League of Women Voters of Andover / North Andover

House
Government of Essex County, Massachusetts